Ernst Georg af Klercker (15 December 1877 – 13 November 1951) was a Swedish film director, screenwriter and actor of the silent era. At the 27th Guldbagge Awards in 1991 he was posthumously presented with the Ingmar Bergman Award. He directed more than 30 films between 1912 and 1926.

Selected filmography
 Mysteriet natten till den 25:e (1916)
 The Österman Brothers' Virago (1925)
 Cavaliers of the Crown (1930)
 South of the Highway (1936)

References

External links

1877 births
1951 deaths
Swedish film directors
Swedish male film actors
Swedish male silent film actors
20th-century Swedish male actors
Swedish male screenwriters
People from Skåne County
20th-century Swedish screenwriters
20th-century Swedish male writers